Xû language may refer to:

Juǀʼhoan language
Khwe language

See also
 Xu language (disambiguation)